The Oxford–Cambridge Arc (formerly the Cambridge – Milton Keynes – Oxford corridor) is a notional arc of agricultural and urban land at about  radius of London, in south central England.  It runs between the two English university cities of Oxford and Cambridge via Milton Keynes and other settlements in Bedfordshire, Buckinghamshire, Cambridgeshire, Northamptonshire, Oxfordshire at the northern rim of the London commuter belt. It is significant only in economic geography, with little physical geography in common.

The original Oxford to Cambridge (O2C) Arc initiative was launched in 2003 by three English regional development agencies (RDAs), EEDA, EMDA and SEEDA. The aim of the initiative is to promote and accelerate the development of the unique set of educational, research and business assets and activities that characterise the area and in doing so, create an "arc of innovation and entrepreneurial activity that would, in time, be 'best in the field'".

In November 2017, a report for the National Infrastructure Commission (NIC) noted that, "in 2014, the Gross Value Added (GVA) of the "corridor" was £90.5bn (2011 prices); by doubling housebuilding rates in the area, and delivering East West Rail and the Oxford–Cambridge Expressway, this [would] increase by £163bn to a GVA of £250bn". In February 2021, the Government announced plans to develop the concept further, but cancelled the AbingdonMilton Keynes link of the expressway in March 2021. , East West Rail development continues but the (then) Minister has suggested that the BedfordCambridge leg could be cancelled.

Industry
The Arc is a major centre of the UK's high tech manufacturing and research industries. It is serviced by four international airports (Stansted, Luton, Heathrow and Birmingham), all located just outside the Arc itself.  Cranfield Airport, Cambridge Airport and London Oxford Airport take executive jets. Cambridge Airport is an important centre for aircraft maintenance.

Other major industries include agriculture, tourism, construction, entertainment, education, retail and finance. A high proportion of the population commutes daily to London. Commuting and business travel within the arc is relatively difficult in the absence of east–west infrastructure.

Future
In 2017, the National Infrastructure Commission projected that the Arc will become host to major hi-tech industrial developments and will need to provide one million new homes by 2050, with Milton Keynes alone doubling in population to 500,000.

To facilitate this development (and wider national infrastructure needs for outer orbital routes around London), two major projects are underway or were planned. Detailed route options planning began on the Oxford-Milton Keynes phase that is to complete the Oxford-Cambridge Expressway (linking the A34 south of Oxford with the A14 near Cambridge). However, in March 2021, the government cancelled this phase of the Expressway (though construction of the remaining phase of the M11A1M1 element continues).

In February 2021, the Ministry for Housing, Communities and Local Government issued a policy paper setting out "the government's planned approach to developing the Oxford–Cambridge Arc Spatial Framework". The paper identifies the arc as an economic powerhouse with three significant issues that need to be resolved: the natural environment and climate change; connectivity and infrastructure; and the availability of homes where they are most needed.

Universities
The Arc has a major university sector with 20,000 workers as part of the knowledge economy: Oxford University, Oxford Brookes University, Buckingham University, The Open University (HQ Milton Keynes), Cranfield University, University of Bedfordshire, the University of Cambridge, Anglia Ruskin University at Cambridge, and Northampton University.

Demographics
The Arc is one of the most ethnically diverse regions of the UK. Bedford, roughly central to the Arc and with a population of 100,000, is home to native speakers of over 100 languages, a figure which rivals London, Birmingham, Leeds and Manchester. The Arc has the fastest growing population of any of the similar regions within the UK; several of the major towns and cities, most notably Bicester and Milton Keynes, are set to double in size over the coming few decades, and others, such as Cambourne, have been built from scratch since the late 1990s. 

Politically, the Arc is largely a Conservative stronghold, with only the urban constituencies returning Liberal Democrat or Labour MPs.

Transport

The region is well served by major radial routes from London (the M40, M1, A1(M) and M11 motorways, and the West Coast Main Line, the Midland Main Line and the East Coast Main Line railways).  However, routes around the arc are poor, with a disjointed and overloaded road network. and a fragmentary railway line (remnants of the former Varsity Line).

In November 2017, in its report on the Arc, the NIC called for the railway line between Bicester and Bletchley to be reopened by 2023 and a new route between Bedford and Cambridge to be operational by 2030, and for the development and construction of a new grade separated dual carriageway between the M1 and Oxford by 2030, as part of a new OxfordCambridge Expressway. The Expressway was cancelled in March 2021. , construction of East West Rail between Bicester and Bletchley (Milton Keynes) remains under construction with entry into operation scheduled for 2025. , the route through Bedford to Cambridge is still in detailed planning but the Minister has cast doubt on whether earlier commitments will be honoured and construction proceed.

Major settlements

Oxfordshire
 Oxford †‡ 
 Kidlington
 Didcot
 Abingdon-on-Thames
 Bicester †‡

Buckinghamshire
 Buckingham ‡
 Milton Keynes †‡* 
 Aylesbury († via spur)

Bedfordshire

 Ampthill
 Flitwick
 Kempston *
 Bedford †‡*
 Sandy (possibly † from )
 Biggleswade

Cambridgeshire
 Cambourne †*
 Cambridge †*
 Huntingdon
 St Ives
 St Neots * (possibly † from )

Northamptonshire
 Brackley
 Corby
 Daventry
 Kettering
 Northampton
 Rushden
 Wellingborough

‡ Places served by X5 route. Since August 2020, the service terminates at Bedford. Passengers for Cambridge must transfer to a rural multi-stop service,
† Places planned to be served by East West Rail. , plans for Sandy/Tempsford/St Neots services via EWR have not beed detailed.
* Places planned to be served by the Oxford Cambridge Expressway. , the route (if ever) of an Expressway between the M1 and the A34 is undecided. Locations shown above with an asterisk are on the A421/A428 route, which is already expressway standard.

See also 
 Varsity Line
 Silicon Fen
 Thames Gateway
 M4 Corridor
 England's Economic Heartland

References

External links
 http://www.eastwestcorridor.co.uk/ (a website set up by regional law firm, Howes Percival, which collates and comments on information as developments happen across the corridor).
  England's Economic Heartland
 National Infrastructure Commission's  interim report on the CambridgeMilton KeynesOxford corridor
 https://www.gov.uk/government/speeches/oxford-to-cambridge-expressway-road-scheme-update

Regions of England
Geography of Oxford
Milton Keynes
Bedford
Geography of Cambridge
Economic geography
Economy of England